The 2019 Texas Longhorns football team, known variously as "Texas", "UT", the "Longhorns", or the "Horns”, represented the University of Texas at Austin during the 2019 NCAA Division I FBS football season. The Longhorns played their home games at Darrell K Royal–Texas Memorial Stadium in Austin, Texas. They are a charter member of the Big 12 Conference. They were led by third-year head coach Tom Herman.

Having ended their Big 12 play tied for third place in the conference standings, the Longhorns upset the No. 10 Utah Utes in the 2019 Alamo Bowl to finish the season 8-5 and ranked No. 25.

Preseason

Big 12 media poll
The 2019 Big 12 media days were held July 15–16, 2019 in Frisco, Texas. In the Big 12 preseason media poll, Texas was predicted to finish in second in the standings behind Oklahoma.

Preseason All-Big 12 teams
To be released

Previous season
The Longhorns finished the 2018 season 10–4, 7–2 in Big 12 play to finish in second place. They were invited to the Sugar Bowl where they defeated Georgia, after which the Texas QB claimed that Texas was "back". It was Texas’ first 10-win season since 2009.

Schedule
Source:

Personnel

Coaching staff
Source:

Roster
Source:

Game summaries

Louisiana Tech

LSU

@ Rice

Oklahoma State

@ West Virginia

vs. Oklahoma

Kansas 

The underdog Kansas Jayhawks stayed with the #15 Texas Longhorns for four quarters of play. In the last minutes, Carter Stanley was successful with a 22-yard scoring pass to Stephon Robinson. The following 2-point conversion throw to Daylon Charlot put the Jayhawks ahead by one point. With 1:11 left to play, Texas took over and put together an offensive drive that ended with a game-winning field goal for the Longhorns.

Even with the loss, several of the Kansas players gave great performances: Pooka Williams rushed for 190 yards and two touchdowns; quarterback Carter Stanley threw 310 yards and four touchdowns for the Jayhawks. For the Longhorns, Sam Ehlinger rushed for 91 yards and managed 399 yards passing with four touchdowns. When everything was complete, Texas won by a score of 50–48.

@ TCU

Kansas State 

In the days leading up to the Kansas State-Texas game, Texas football quarterback Sam Ehlinger was named a semifinalist for the 2019 Wuerffel Trophy.  On that same day,  the College Football Playoff committee ranked Kansas State at #16 in the first playoff ranking of the season.  This was measurably higher than the #20 in the AP Poll and #22 in the USA Today Poll.

The game started with Kansas State taking a 14-point lead in the first quarter and allowed Texas to score a touchdown, making it 14–7 at halftime.  Texas took the lead in the third quarter with ten more points to put it at 14–17.  Each team added 10 more points in the fourth quarter to make the final score a Texas win 27–24, punctuated with a 26 yard game-winning field goal by the Longhorns' Cameron Dicker just as the clock ran out.

@ Iowa State

@ Baylor

Texas Tech

vs. Utah (Alamo Bowl)

Rankings

Players drafted into the NFL

Notes

References

Texas
Texas Longhorns football seasons
Alamo Bowl champion seasons
Texas Longhorns football